Shizue (written: 静江, しずえ in hiragana or シヅエ in katakana) is a feminine Japanese given name, also romanized as Shidzue. Notable people with the name include:

, Japanese idol, actress and singer
, Japanese activist and politician
, Japanese swimmer
, Japanese actress
, Japanese manga artist
, Japanese actress
, Ainu activist

Fictional characters
 Shizue, known as Isabelle in the English versions, a character from Animal Crossing 
 Shizue Izawa, known as Shizu, a character from That Time I Got Reincarnated as a Slime
 Shizue Kuranushi, Known as Boss, from AI: The Somnium Files

Japanese feminine given names